Postplatyptilia seitetazas is a moth of the family Pterophoridae. It is known from Chile.

The wingspan is about 15 mm. Adults are on wing in January.

Etymology
The species is named after the locality in which it was collected.

References

seitetazas
Moths described in 2006
Endemic fauna of Chile